U.S. Route 79 (US 79) enters Kentucky from Tennessee in Todd County west of Guthrie and runs northeast into Logan County, terminating at a junction with US 68, US 68 Business, and Kentucky Route 80 (KY 80) in Russellville. US 79 remains a two-lane road throughout Kentucky.

Route description
US 79 in Kentucky begins at the Tennessee state line west of Guthrie and travels northeast, forming a junction with US 41  from the state line. The route continues to the northeast, passing north of Guthrie and Allensville in rural areas of Todd County.  from the Kentucky-Tennessee border, US 79 crosses into Logan County where it becomes known as Clarksville Road. The route continues northeast through rural areas of Logan County until it comes to an intersection with US 431, the Russellville Bypass, on the south side of Russellville  from the Todd County line. US 79 and US 431 run concurrently along the Bypass south of town where it intersects KY 96 and the concurrency ending at Nashville Road (US 431 continues south while KY 2146 begins and heads north). US 79 and the Bypass begin to curve back north where it intersects KY 100 at its western terminus (KY 100 formerly continued along the Bypass to US 79's current terminus). US 79 ends at an intersection with Bowling Green Road which carries US 68 and KY 80 to the east and US 68 Bus. to the west towards downtown Russellville.

History

The current route in Kentucky was paved by 1939 but was not signed as US 79. The highway was originally designated as Kentucky Route 105. KY 105 originally ran the original alignment of U.S. Route 79 and the current alignment of Kentucky Route 79, from the state line to Russellville to the Rough River Lake State Resort Park area, and ending with KY 105's current alignment. By 1958, the current route was signed as US 79, although, it extended a bit further northeast into Russellville. Its northern terminus at US 431 was created by the early 2010s with the construction of a segment of the Russellville Bypass from US 79 to US 68 on the western outskirts of Russellville. 

In November 2017, US 79's northern terminus returned to the east side of Russellville when it was routed onto the southern section of the Russellville Bypass loop when it was completed.

Major intersections

References

External links

 Kentucky
79
0079
0079